Odessa High School may refer to:
Odessa High School (Delaware)
Odessa High School (Texas)